Branimir Ćosić (Serbian: Бранимир Ћосић) (13 September 1903 – 29 January 1934) was a Serbian writer and journalist born in the village of Štitar and died in Belgrade at 31 from tuberculosis. He studied philosophy and law in Belgrade, Lausanne and Paris. Ćosić published his texts in Politika (1924), Reči i slika (1926) and Pravda (1930–1934). His parents were teachers in schools in nearby villages.

Works
 Stories about Bošković, stories (1924)
 Egyptian woman and other romantic stories, stories  (1927)
 As the past waters, stories (1933)
 Vicious Round, novel (1925)
 Two Kingdoms, novel (1928)
 Mown Field, novel (1933)
 Ten writers - ten conversations, interviews

References

1903 births
1934 deaths
Writers from Šabac
Serbian male short story writers
Serbian short story writers
Serbian novelists
Serbian non-fiction writers
Serbian journalists
20th-century Serbian novelists
20th-century short story writers
20th-century male writers
20th-century journalists
Male non-fiction writers